Aliwan Fiesta is an annual event that gathers different cultural festivals of the Philippines in Star City Complex in Pasay wherein contingents compete in dance parade and float competitions. Organized by Manila Broadcasting Company (MBC) together with Cultural Center of the Philippines (CCP) and the cities of Manila and Pasay, the event is dubbed as "the Philippines' Grandest Fiesta," with prizes totaling P3 million (roughly US$70,000). Aliwan Fiesta, which began in 2003, aims to showcase the different Filipino cultures and heritage not only to the people in Metro Manila but also to the rest of the world. The contingents, meanwhile, aim to promote their respective regions both economically and tourism-wise. It was originally organized as a visual extravaganza for the Christmas season, but it has since been held during the summer months of either April or May. Aliwan is a Tagalog word for "entertainment" or "amusement."  Aliwan Fiesta festivities are covered live on DZRH News Television annually.

Competition

Aliwan Fiesta is divided into three categories: Cultural Street Dance Competition (the main event), Float Parade, and Reyna ng Aliwan (Queen of Entertainment/Amusement) competition. Each of the country's 17 regions have the option to send up to two contingents representing its respective cultural festival, as well as an option to send a representing float and or Reyna ng Aliwan contestant. However, the roster of entries for the cultural dance and float competitions are limited. In 2008, the number of slots for cultural dance was increased from 20 to 24 groups, which was completed as early as January. Each contingent in the cultural street dance competition—totaling up to 100 dancers as well as hundreds of musicians and support staff members—have undergone stringent elimination cycles during various local festivals before being chosen to compete in Aliwan Fiesta. The highlight of the event is when all competing festivals show off their dance skills while parading for four kilometers (about 2½ miles) along Roxas Boulevard from Quirino Grandstand to Aliw Theater grounds located near CCP. The festivals range from the well-known such as Dinagyang of Iloilo City, Sinulog of Cebu City, and Panagbenga of Baguio, to the obscure but just-as-interesting feasts like Alikaraw of Hilongos, Leyte, Padang-Padang of Parang, Shariff Kabunsuan, and Pamitinan Festival of Rodriguez, Rizal. Side events also include a bazaar featuring different regional products, a photography contest, an inter-scholastic dance competition (interpreting dance tunes played on MBC radio stations), Filipino street games, and a fireworks display.

Meanwhile, the participating floats are only allowed to use local textiles, produce, flowers, and other products specific in their representing city in decorating the vehicles. Each float, portraying local folklore and indigenous traditions, is topped by a participant of Reyna ng Aliwan serving as muse.  Laoag's PAMULINAWEN festival has the distinction of winning the float competition the most number of times.

The province of CEBU, in turn, holds the record of the most wins in the Reyna ng Aliwan Pageant—six consecutive times from 2009 until 2014, and recapturing the crown in 2016 and 2017. However in 2019, Cebu's Sinulog festival queen who won Reyna ng Aliwan was stripped of her title for having violated the terms and conditions of her reign.  The Panagbenga festival queen assumed the title and her duties for the rest of the year—the third time a Baguio lass wore the crown.  The Reyna ng Aliwan pageant is considered the training ground of many national pageant winners, who have also gone on to compete—and win—international titles.  Among these are Jamie Herrell and Karla Henry who won Miss Earth;  Rizzini Alexis Gomez and Angeli Dione Gomez, who won the Miss Tourism International crowns back-to-back; Cynthia Thomalla, who was crowned Miss Eco International; Sharifa Aqeel who was named Miss Asia Pacific International; Vera Eumee Reiter, who won Mutya ng Pilipinas; as well as Mary Jean Lastimosa, Rogelie Catacutan, and Ma. Ahtisa Manalo, who won Bb. Pilipinas titles.

The top ten contingents in the cultural dance and float competitions receive cash prizes, with the top float winner receiving P500,000 (roughly US$11,000) and the winning cultural dance group getting P1 million (about US$23,000) as well as the bragging rights of becoming the champion of Aliwan Fiesta. Meanwhile, the Reyna ng Aliwan receives P100,000 (roughly US$2,300).

Aliwan Fiesta also takes pride in foreign exposure given to its winners.  Lumad Basakanon of Cebu's Sinulog, Tribu Panayanon of Iloilo Dinagyang, and the Manggahan Festival of Guimaras have all represented the country in various international festivals overseas.  Aliwan Fiesta itself was featured in the Philippine pavilions at the 2011 Prague Quadrennial on Performance Space and Design, held in the Czech Republic;  the Philippine delegation won the special children's prize for its efforts.

Aliwan Fiesta winners

Festival Dance (Street Dance) Competition

Special awards

Dinagyang Festival of Iloilo City has had the most wins in the cultural dance category, first winning in 2004, followed by four straight championships from 2010 to 2013, as anchored by different contingents from various public high schools in Iloilo.
Another contingent from Cebu, Sinulog sa Carmen, also won third place year 2008 (both contingents, Lumad Basakanon for Sinulog Festival of Cebu City and Sinulog sa Carmen from the Cebu Province, landed in the top three (1ST and 3RD placers respectively) Lumad Basakanon was elevated to the Aliwan Hall-of-Fame).
Other Aliwan Fiesta streetdancing champions include Halad Festival of Midsayap, Cotabato (2003) and 2004 Dinagyang's Tribu Atub-Atub, 2005 Pintados de Passi of Passi City, Iloilo 2010 Dinagyang's Tribu Paghidaet, Dinagyang's Tribu Pan-ay in 2011, and in 2015 and 2016 Tribu Katbalaugan for the Manaragat Festival of Catbalogan.
In Aliwan Fiesta 2014 the Aliwan Hall of Fame awardee Lumad Basakanon of Sinulog Festival of Cebu reclaimed the Aliwan Fiesta Streetdancing Championship. Meguyaya Festival of Upi, Maguindanao came in second place, T'nalak Festival of South Cotabato in third place, followed by Pamulinawen Festival of Laoag City, Ilocos Norte in fourth and Caragan Festival of Mabalacat City, Pampanga in fifth place.

Tugtog ng Aliwan

Float design

Aliwan Fiesta Digital Queen (2020-present)

Reyna ng Aliwan (2003-2019)

{| class="wikitable sortable" style="font-size:95%;"
|-
! Year
! Reyna ng Aliwan(Aliwan Festival Queen)
! Festival Origin
! Cultural Festival
! Post Pageant Title/s
! International Competition
|-
| rowspan="2" style="text-align:left;" |  2019
| Roi Neeve Comanda (Assumed)
| Baguio 
| Panagbenga Festival
| 
|
|-
| Nicole Borromeo (Dethroned)
| Cebu
| Sinulog Festival 
| Miss Millennial Philippines 2019Binibining Pilipinas International 2023
|
|-
| 2018 
| Chelsea Fernandez
| Tacloban
| Sangyaw Festival 
| Miss Philippines Earth-Water 2019Binibining Pilipinas Globe 2022
| The Miss Globe 2022 Top 15
|-
| 2017 
| Marla Alforque
| Cebu 
| Sinulog Festival 
| Miss Earth Philippines 2018 Runner-up/Top 10
|
|-
|2016
|Cynthia Thomalla
|Cebu
|Sinulog Festival
|Miss Eco Philippines 2017
|Miss Eco International 2018 Winner
|-
|2015
|Stephanie Joy Abellanida
|Midsayap
|Halad Festival
|Binibining Pilipinas 2018 candidate
|
|-
|2014
|Steffi Rose Aberasturi
|Cebu
|Sinulog Festival
|Miss Universe Philippines 2021 2nd Runner-up
|
|-
|2013
|Jamie Herrell
|Cebu
|Sinulog Festival
|Miss Philippines Earth 2014
|Miss Earth 2014 Winner
|-
|2012
|Angeli Dione Gomez
|Cebu
|Sinulog Festival
|Binibining Pilipinas 2013 candidateMutya ng Pilipinas 2013 Tourism International
|Miss Tourism International 2013-2014 Winner
|-
|2011
|Rogelie Catacutan
|Cebu
|Sinulog Festival
|Miss World Philippines 2011 Top 12Binibining Pilipinas Supranational 2015
|Miss Supranational 2015 Top 20 
|-
|2010
|Rizzini Alexis Gomez †
|Cebu
|Sinulog Festival
|Miss World Philippines 2012 candidateMutya ng Pilipinas Tourism International 2012
|Miss Tourism International 2012-2013 Winner
|-
|2009
|Sian Elizabeth Maynard
|Cebu
|Sinulog Festival
|Miss Philippines Earth 2010 Top 10 
|
|-
|2008
|Mary Jean Lastimosa
|Davao
|Kadayawan Festival
|Binibining Pilipinas 2011 2nd Runner-upBinibining Pilipinas 2012 Top 12 FinalistMiss Universe Philippines 2014
|Miss Universe 2014 Top 10 Finalist
|-
|2007
|Mary Jane dela Cruz
|Bulacan
|Desposorio Festival
|Binibining Pilipinas 2009 candidate
|
|-
|2006
|Vera Eumee Reiter
|Baguio
|Panagbenga Festival
|Binibining Pilipinas 2006 candidateMutya ng Pilipinas Tourism International 2006
|
|-
|2005
|Syrel Aubrey Amazona
|Baguio
|Panagbenga Festival
|
|
|-
|2004
|Jasmin Versoza
|Laoag
|Pamulenawen Festival
|
|
|-
|2003
|Tisha Veloso
|Leyte
|Sangyaw Festival
|
|
|}

Coffee table book
MBC presented a coffee table book in 2008 entitled Aliwan Fiesta: Celebrating Life In These 7,107 Islands''. It was documented by cultural affairs specialist Susan Isorena-Arcega, featuring various photographs taken during Aliwan Fiesta's first five years. The book aims to tackle the Filipino's festive psyche, the multi-pronged treatise on what the Philippine festivals are rooted in, and the display of cultural heritage through dance and craftsmanship.  A second volume entitled "Aliwan Fiesta:  The Festival of Champions," was published in 2013.  A third volume is currently being compiled.

Footnotes

External links
Aliwan Fiesta Official Website
Official Website of the Manila Broadcasting Company
Photos of Aliwan Fiesta 2008, as featured on CNN's iReport
Aliwan Fiesta 2012 Schedule of Activities

Festivals in Metro Manila